Verkhniy Aluchalu is a town in the Gegharkunik Province of Armenia.

References 

Populated places in Gegharkunik Province